In mathematics, Tate's isogeny theorem, proved by , states that two abelian varieties over a finite field are isogeneous if and only if their Tate modules are isomorphic (as Galois representations).

References

Abelian varieties
Theorems in algebraic geometry